Slim Agrebi (born 12 January 1974) is a Tunisian judoka. He competed in the men's heavyweight event at the 1996 Summer Olympics.

References

External links

1974 births
Living people
Tunisian male judoka
Olympic judoka of Tunisia
Judoka at the 1996 Summer Olympics
Place of birth missing (living people)
African Games medalists in judo
Competitors at the 1995 All-Africa Games
African Games gold medalists for Tunisia
20th-century Tunisian people
21st-century Tunisian people